Thermochoria is a genus of dragonfly in the family Libellulidae. It contains only two species:
Thermochoria equivocata 
Thermochoria jeanneli

References

Libellulidae
Anisoptera genera
Taxonomy articles created by Polbot